The Drum Barracks, also known as Camp Drum and the Drum Barracks Civil War Museum, is the last remaining original American Civil War era military facility in the Los Angeles area.  Located in the Wilmington section of Los Angeles, near the Port of Los Angeles, it has been designated as a California Historic Landmark, a Los Angeles Historic Cultural Monument and has been listed on the National Register of Historic Places.  Since 1987, it has been operated as a Civil War museum that is open to the public.

History
With the outbreak of the American Civil War in April 1861, there were concerns on the Union side about the loyalty and security of the Los Angeles area.  Many of the area's residents were recent arrivals from the Southern states, and southerner John C. Breckinridge received twice as many local votes as Abraham Lincoln in the 1860 Presidential election.  A company of secessionists was also holding public drills in El Monte, California, displaying California's Bear flag instead of the Stars and Stripes.

Phineas Banning, the founder of Wilmington (then known as New San Pedro), wrote a letter to President Lincoln advising that the Union would lose California unless some provision was made to quell pro-Confederacy sentiment. Initially, the Union moved a garrison from Fort Tejon to Camp Latham near Culver City, California. Later in 1861, Banning and Benjamin Davis Wilson, the first mayor of Los Angeles, donated  in Wilmington to the government for one dollar each for use in construction of a Union garrison. By January 1862, the military command had moved from Camp Latham to Camp Drum in Wilmington, and by March 1862, all but one company of Camp Latham's troops had been moved to Camp Drum. By March 1864, official letters and papers referred to the encampment as Drum Barracks rather than Camp Drum.

Camp Drum and Drum Barracks get their name from Col. Richard Coulter Drum, then Assistant Adjutant General of the Army's Department of the Pacific, stationed in San Francisco, and not after a percussion instrument.  There is no record that Col. Drum ever saw or set foot in the station bearing his name.

During the Civil War, Camp Drum was the headquarters of the District of Southern California and the home to the California Column, commanded by Colonel James Henry Carleton.  Between 2,000 and 7,000 soldiers were stationed at Camp Drum, and Wilmington became a thriving community with a population greater than Los Angeles during the war.

In 1862, Texas Volunteers had taken control of large portions of New Mexico Territory (which included present-day Arizona) for the Confederacy, and Colonel Carleton was ordered to retake control of the territory.  Approximately 2,350 soldiers from the California Column marched from Camp Drum and fought the Battle of Picacho Pass, the westernmost battle of the Civil War.

In 1864, the federal government feared attempts by Confederate sympathizers to outfit privateers to sink ships carrying gold and silver from the Comstock Lode to aid the Union.  To deprive them of an anchorage, Company C, 4th California Infantry under Captain West, occupied Catalina Island on January 1, 1864, and put an end to gold mining by ordering everyone off the island.  A small garrison of Union troops were stationed at Camp Santa Catalina Island on the isthmus on the island's west end for about nine months.  Their barracks remain as the oldest structure on the island in the Two Harbors area and are currently the home of the Isthmus Yacht Club.

Camp Drum also served as a deterrent to Confederate sympathizers in the Los Angeles area, helped keep the territory loyal to the Union, and prevented Confederate use of the Los Angeles harbor.

After the Civil War, Camp Drum remained active for several years in the Indian Wars. By 1870, it had been deactivated and fallen into disrepair.  In October 1871, the Los Angeles Star reported that all remaining troops at Drum Barracks had been ordered to Fort Yuma.

In 1873, the government returned the land to Banning and Wilson after auctioning off the buildings. Banning bought five of the buildings for $2,917, and Wilson bought one for $200.

Historic designations, preservation and use as a museum

In 1927, the Drum Barracks was designated a historic monument by the Native Sons of the Golden West, and in 1935 it was officially designated as California Historic Landmark #169. With the formation of the Los Angeles Cultural Heritage Commission in 1962, Drum Barracks was one of the first sites designated as a Historic Cultural Landmark (HCM #21), receiving the monument designation in 1963.  It was also designated as and listed on the National Register of Historic Places in 1971.

In 1963, the owner of the property offered the property for sale, and concerns arose about its potential demolition. Under the leadership of Walter Holstein, local residents formed The Society for The Preservation of Drum Barracks, raising funds to purchase the property. In 1967, under the leadership of Oliver Vickery, curator of the Banning House, and Joan Lorenzen, the State of California purchased the Drum Barracks, with the Society retaining responsibility for maintenance and operation of the barracks as a historic site. In 1986, the State turned over the property to the City of Los Angeles on the condition that it be operated as a Civil War museum.

The surviving 16-room structure was the officers' quarters, which was once one of 19 similar buildings on the site. Today, the barracks is open as a museum which commemorates California's contribution to the Civil War.

Disturbances
The surviving building holds a local reputation as the locale of various paranormal activity, with visitors and local residents claiming to hear the sound of rattling chains or wagon wheels and horses' hooves, seeing smoke (presumably from soldiers' pipes), spotting apparitions of a woman in a hoop skirt, and smelling a strong lavender violet perfume. The Drum Barracks was profiled on Unsolved Mysteries in the early 1990s in a segment called 'Civil War Ghosts'. Some of the people interviewed in that segment claimed to have seen apparitions of Civil War soldiers. In 2005 the Barracks was featured in an episode of Most Haunted.

California Historical Landmark
California Historical Landmark Marker #169 at the site reads:
NO. 169 DRUM BARRACKS - Established in 1862, Drum Barracks became the United States military headquarters for Southern California, Arizona, and New Mexico. It was a garrison and base for supplies, and a terminus for camel pack trains operated by the Army until 1863. Abandoned in 1866, the site remains a landmark of the Civil War in California.

See also
 List of Registered Historic Places in Los Angeles
 List of Los Angeles Historic-Cultural Monuments in the Harbor area
 Mojave Road Los Angeles California Historical Landmark near Drum Barracks
 Camp Cady California Historical Landmark on road to Drum Barracks

Footnotes

External links

 Official Drum Barracks Civil War Museum website
  California State Military Museum: "History of the Drum Barracks" webpage
 Los Angeles Public Library files:
  Brochure from Drum Barracks Museum
 Pamphlet used by tour guides at Drum Barracks Museum
 "Drum Barracks and Camel Corps" – article by The Society for Preservation of Drum Barracks.
  Articles on Drum Barracks
  "Is local museum haunted?", by Eric Wilhelmus – article in Random Lengths, Oct. 31 – Nov. 13, 1991

American Civil War army posts
American Civil War museums in California
Barracks on the National Register of Historic Places
Museums in Los Angeles
Wilmington, Los Angeles
California in the American Civil War
Forts in California
Formerly Used Defense Sites in California
California Historical Landmarks
Los Angeles Historic-Cultural Monuments
Military facilities on the National Register of Historic Places in Los Angeles
Closed installations of the United States Army
Government buildings completed in 1863
Residential buildings completed in 1863
History of Los Angeles
Reportedly haunted locations in Los Angeles
Supernatural legends
1863 establishments in California
1870 disestablishments in California
19th century in Los Angeles
American Civil War on the National Register of Historic Places